John Lauder (c. 1488 – between 1551 and 1556) was Scotland's Public Accuser of Heretics.

John Lauder may also refer to:
John Lauder, Lord Fountainhall (1646–1722), Scottish jurist
Sir John Lauder, 3rd Baronet (1669–1728)
Sir John Lauder, 1st Baronet (1595–1692)
John Lauder (surgeon) (1683–1737), Scottish surgeon
John D. Lauder (1855–1934), Canadian politician
John Lauder (priest) (1829–1900), Dean of Ottawa

See also
John Dick-Lauder (disambiguation)